"Epidemic" is a song by American rapper Polo G. It was released as the lead single from his third studio album, Hall of Fame (2021), on September 25, 2020. It was produced by Tahj Money, D Mac, LondnBlu and Karltin Bankz.

Composition and lyrics
In the song, Polo G sing-raps about losing people close to him, especially those who died by gun violence, which is described as an "epidemic", stating: "I'm so sick of farewells and RIP's / In the trenches yellin', "Gang gang", mob ties what I bleed / Don't claim to be an opp, 'cause niggas die from that disease / He gon' let that 9 blow with ease". Later, he vows to be careful for the sake of his family ("Promise to my son that the streets won't get no more of me / Remember every line from that obituary poetry"). The song is sung over a piano-based beat.

Music video
The music video was released alongside the single. Directed by Ryan Lynch and shot in Miami, it shows the "lavish lifestyle" of Polo G. The rapper spends time with his friends; he rides in yachts and motorcycles, hanging in the studio and playing basketball.

Charts

Certifications

References

2020 singles
2020 songs
Polo G songs
Columbia Records singles
Songs written by Polo G
Songs about violence